Christian Jaymar Perez (born November 17, 1993) is a Filipino professional basketball player for the San Miguel Beermen of the Philippine Basketball Association (PBA). He was selected 1st overall in the 2018 PBA draft by Columbian Dyip.

Early life and college career
Although born in Kowloon, Hong Kong, CJ lives and grew up in Bautista, Pangasinan, Philippines.

CJ Perez played for San Sebastian College – Recoletos Stags, Ateneo De Manila Blue Eagles and Lyceum of the Philippines University Pirates.

In his final college season, he averaged a league-best 19.3 points per game, while grabbing 6.5 rebounds and 3.6 assists while leading the Pirates to an 18-game sweep of the eliminations, where they were eventually beaten by San Beda in the Finals. He also could have been on the NCAA Mythical Team that year if not for a suspension.

Professional career

PBA D-League
Perez played for Zark's Burger-Lyceum, which was composed of the core of the Pirates that won 18 straight games in the NCAA Season 93 tournament before losing in the Finals to the San Beda Red Lions. He led Zark's Burger-Lyceum to the Finals averaging 17.5 points, 6.5 rebounds, 3.9 assists, and 1.9 steals to the championship round. He was named as the 2018 PBA D-League Aspirants’ Cup Conference Most Valuable Player.

Columbian / Terrafirma Dyip (2018–2020)
On December 16, 2018, Perez was selected first overall by the Columbian Dyip in the 2018 PBA draft. In his first career game, he scored 26 points in a win against the San Miguel Beermen. Three games later, he was unanimously awarded the first-ever PBA Press Corps Rookie of the Month for January. For the month of February, Perez was second in voting for Rookie of the Month, losing the award to Javee Mocon. During All-Star Weekend, he participated in the Rookies/Sophomores vs. Juniors game (winning MVP), the slam dunk contest, and the All-Star 3x3. His team did not qualify for the playoffs for the Philippine Cup, finishing with a 4-7 record. In the Commissioner's Cup, Perez exploded for a career-high 39 points in a 120-105 win against the NLEX Road Warriors. He ended the 2019 season with the Rookie of the Year award, a First Mythical Team selection (the first rookie since Calvin Abueva in 2013), and was on the All-Defensive Team (the first rookie since Ryan Reyes in 2008.) He also led the league in scoring with 20.8 points, the first rookie since Eric Menk to do so, back in 1999. His 20.8 points a game is also the third-highest among  the highest scoring averages for a rookie in the PBA.

In his final season with Terrafirma, he averaged 24.4 points a game, leading the league in scoring.

San Miguel Beermen (2021–present)
On February 2, 2021, Perez was traded to the San Miguel Beermen for Matt Ganuelas-Rosser, Russel Escoto, Gelo Alolino, and two future first-round picks. Perez won his first championship with the Beermen in the 2022 Philippine Cup. In Game 7, he scored 25 points, including 7 during the Beermen's 4th quarter rally.

PBA career statistics

As of the end of 2021 season

Season-by-season averages

|-
| align=left | 
| align=left | Columbian
| 33 || 37.8 || .447 || .325 || .639 || 7.4 || 3.4 || 1.9 || .4 || 20.8
|-
| align=left | 
| align=left | Terrafirma
| 11 || 37.2 || .436 || .269 || .623 || 6.8 || 4.3 || 2.0 || .6 || 24.4
|-
| align=left | 
| align=left | San Miguel
| 32 || 29.5 || .433 || .308 || .688 || 5.8 || 1.8 || 1.3 || .5 || 14.8
|- class="sortbottom"
| style="text-align:center;" colspan="2"|Career
| 76 || 34.2 || .440 || .308 || .650 || 6.6 || 2.8 || 1.6 || .4 || 18.8

National team career 
Perez first started playing at the national team level in 2016, as a member of Gilas 5.0 for the FIBA Asia Challenge. He was also a member of the Team Manila roster for the 2016 FIBA 3x3 All Stars in Doha, Qatar. He played with Rey Guevarra, Sidney Onwubere and Bright Akhuetie in this competition. The team finished 7th out of 8th competitors.

In 2019, Perez was one of the youngest members of the Gilas team that played in the 2019 FIBA Basketball World Cup. His averages of 12.6 points, 3.2 rebounds, and 2.6 assists and fearless brand of basketball was a silver lining in a campaign that saw the Philippines finish dead last in the World Cup. He was named to the Gilas 3x3 team for the SEA Games, along with Chris Newsome, Jason Perkins, and Moala Tautuaa. That team went on to sweep their competition in eight games, winning the gold medal

In 2020, Perez was among the 12 chosen for the Asia Cup qualifiers against Indonesia. He had 11 points, 7 rebounds, 3 assists and 4 steals in that game that they won, 100-70. Perez was also named to the FIBA 3x3 OQT lineup, along with SEA Games teammate Moala Tautuaa, Joshua Munzon, and Alvin Pasaol. They finished in last place in that tournament.

Player profile
Perez's game has been primarily influenced by Calvin Abueva, to the point where he notes Abueva as his favorite player at the game. His rebounding and aggressiveness has been compared positively to Calvin Abueva's college years at San Sebastian College – Recoletos.

References

External links
 PBA.ph profile
 FIBA Basketball World Cup 2019 profile
 
 
 
 CJ Perez at RealGM

1993 births
Living people
2019 FIBA Basketball World Cup players
Ateneo de Manila University alumni
Basketball players from Pangasinan
Citizens of the Philippines through descent
Competitors at the 2019 Southeast Asian Games
Filipino men's 3x3 basketball players
Filipino men's basketball players
Filipino people of Nigerian descent
Lyceum Pirates basketball players
Philippine Basketball Association All-Stars
Philippines men's national basketball team players
Philippines national 3x3 basketball team players
San Miguel Beermen players
San Sebastian Stags basketball players
Shooting guards
Small forwards
Southeast Asian Games gold medalists for the Philippines
Southeast Asian Games competitors for the Philippines
Southeast Asian Games medalists in 3x3 basketball
Terrafirma Dyip draft picks
Terrafirma Dyip players